Exhibition (1987) is a double disc compilation album of Gary Numan's hits and selected other tracks released on the Beggars Banquet Records label. The songs cover Numan's career from 1978 (with Tubeway Army) to 1983.

It was released by Beggars Banquet Records in September 1987 as an LP, cassette and, with an expanded track listing, double CD.

The album peaked at #43 in the UK Album Chart. A remix of Numan's 1979 single "Cars", entitled "Cars ('E' Reg Model)" was released to promote the album and peaked at #16.

References

1987 compilation albums
Gary Numan compilation albums
Tubeway Army albums
Beggars Banquet Records compilation albums